Abdelhamid El Kaoutari (born 17 March 1990) is a professional footballer who plays as a centre-back and currently plays for Super League Greece 2 club P.A.E. G.S. Diagoras. Born in France, he represents Morocco at international level.

Football career

El Kaoutari was born in Montpellier and played for his hometown club since childhood, having joined as a youth player. While in the club's youth academy, known as Centre de Formation de La Paillade, he helped the Montpellier under-19 team win the 2008–09 edition of the Coupe Gambardella. After successfully passing through La Paillade, El Kaoutari was allowed to train with the senior team alongside fellow youth teammate Mickaël Nelson. He made his professional debut on 12 May 2008 in a Ligue 2 match against Gueugnon. El Kaoutari appeared as a substitute in the 65th minute. Montpellier won the match 2–1.

For the 2008–09 season, El Kaoutari featured regularly in the Coupe Gambardella and the Coupe de France. He started both Montpellier's Coupe de France victories over amateur club Saint-Flour and third-tier club Cannes. Both matches went into extra time. El Kaoutari also appeared in four league matches, which included three straight matches late in the season, while Montpellier were in the midst of a promotion battle. Montpellier did, indeed, achieve promotion to Ligue 1. El Kaoutari was given a more prominent role in the squad for the 2009–10 Ligue 1 season. After appearing early on as a substitute, by November, El Kaoutari became a staple in the starting eleven, usually starting in the left-back position.

In July 2015, he moved to Italian Serie A club Palermo, when he signed a four-year contract.

On 1 February 2016, El Kaoutari signed a six-month loan deal with Ligue 1 club Reims.

In January 2019, he left Wydad AC for AS Nancy.

International career
El Kaoutari played for the France under-19 team. He was a late addition to the team making his debut during the Elite Round portion of qualification for the 2009 UEFA European Under-19 Football Championship. He was later selected to play in the tournament and featured in all four matches with France suffering elimination in the semi-finals losing 3–1 to England.

El Kaoutari played his first match for Morocco on 4 June 2011 against Algeria (4–0). He was named in Pim Verbeek's 18-man squad for the Morocco U-23 football team to compete at the London 2012 Olympics.

Honours
Montpellier
 Ligue 1: 2011–12

References

External links
 

1990 births
Living people
Association football defenders
Citizens of Morocco through descent
French footballers
Ligue 1 players
Ligue 2 players
Championnat National 3 players
Serie A players
Montpellier HSC players
Palermo F.C. players
Stade de Reims players
SC Bastia players
Wydad AC players
AS Nancy Lorraine players
Diagoras F.C. players
French sportspeople of Moroccan descent
Berber Moroccans
Moroccan footballers
Morocco international footballers
France youth international footballers
2012 Africa Cup of Nations players
2013 Africa Cup of Nations players
Olympic footballers of Morocco
Footballers at the 2012 Summer Olympics
Moroccan expatriate footballers
Moroccan expatriate sportspeople in Italy
Expatriate footballers in Italy
French expatriate sportspeople in Italy
French expatriate footballers
Footballers from Montpellier